The National Basketball Association (NBA) is a professional men's basketball league, consisting of 30 teams in North America—29 in the United States and one in Canada. The NBA was founded in New York City on June 6, 1946, as the Basketball Association of America (BAA). It adopted the name National Basketball Association at the start of the 1949–50 season when it absorbed the National Basketball League (NBL). The NBA is an active member of USA Basketball, which is recognized by the International Basketball Federation (FIBA) as the national governing body for basketball in the country. The league is considered to be one of the four major professional sports leagues of North America.

Relocated teams

The list contains current franchises in the NBA. It does not include name changes.

+Active franchise

See also
 List of defunct National Basketball Association teams

References

 
Sports team relocations